E Centauri is a single star in the southern constellation of Centaurus. It is a white-hued star that is dimly visible to the naked eye with an apparent visual magnitude of +5.34. The distance to this object is approximately 560 light years based on parallax, and it has an absolute magnitude of −0.97. It is drifting closer to the Sun with a radial velocity of +7 km/s, and it is a candidate member of the Lower Centaurus Crux subgroup of the Sco OB2 association.

This is a late B- or early A-type main-sequence star with a stellar classification of B9.5/A0V, which indicates it is generating energy via core hydrogen fusion. It has 3.4 times the mass of the Sun and is spinning with a projected rotational velocity of 74 km/s. The star is radiating 302 times the luminosity of the Sun from its photosphere at an effective temperature of 9,886 K.

References 

B-type main-sequence stars
Lower Centaurus Crux
Centaurus (constellation)
Centauri, E
Durchmusterung objects
105416
059184
4620